is a Japanese former professional baseball pitcher who is currently a pitching coach for the Tohoku Rakuten Golden Eagles of Nippon Professional Baseball (NPB). He has played in NPB for the Yomiuri Giants, Yokohama DeNA BayStars and Eagles.

Career

On March 28, 2003, Kubo made his NPB debut.

On November 7, 2020, Kubo announced his retirement, and held press conference.

References

External links

NBP

1980 births
Living people
Baseball people from Fukuoka (city)
Japanese baseball players
Nippon Professional Baseball pitchers
Yomiuri Giants players
Yokohama DeNA BayStars players
Tohoku Rakuten Golden Eagles players
Japanese baseball coaches
Nippon Professional Baseball coaches